The Sequatchie Valley Railroad  was originally part of the Jasper Branch Railroad that was founded in 1860.  The SQVR took over in the mid 1990s and now runs from Bridgeport, Alabama, to near Jasper, Tennessee.  It is categorized as a "Local Railroad" by the AAR.

References 

 South Pittsburg Historic Preservation Society

Alabama railroads
Tennessee railroads
Spin-offs of CSX Transportation